St Michael (St Miles) Coslany, Norwich is a Grade I listed redundant parish church in the Church of England in Norwich. The building is located on Coslany Street, between Oak Street and Colegate.

History

The church is noted for its remarkable display of flushwork of white stone against black flint. The south aisle retains it from the fifteenth century and was added in 1500, by Alderman Gregory Clark.

The chapel at the east end was added by Robert Thorpe as his chantry chapel. The north aisle was built by Alderman William Ramsey in 1502–04. The nave was rebuilt by the Stalon brothers in the early sixteenth century.

The south porch was demolished in 1747. A restoration was carried out in 1883 to 1884 when the flushwork on the chancel was rebuilt, and a new east window added.

The bell tower dates back to the 13th century.

Inspire Discovery Centre

During the mid 1990s to mid 2011 the church building was home to a charity called INSPIRE, a children's activity attraction dedicated to the exploration of science through hands-on techniques. The charity has since closed.

Organ

A Norman and Beard organ was installed in 1885 but has been transferred elsewhere. A specification of the organ can be found on the National Pipe Organ Register.

References

Saint Michael
15th-century church buildings in England
Grade I listed buildings in Norfolk